Jacqueline del Rocío Mollocana Eleno (born 29 January 1994) is an Ecuadorian freestyle wrestler. She won the gold medal in the women's 50 kg event at the 2022 Bolivarian Games held in Valledupar, Colombia. She is a gold medalist at the South American Games and a three-time medalist at the Pan American Wrestling Championships.

Career 

In 2018, she lost her bronze medal match against Mariana Díaz Muñoz of Mexico in the women's 50 kg event at the Pan American Wrestling Championships held in Lima, Peru. A month later, she won the bronze medal in the women's 50 kg event at the 2018 South American Games held in Cochabamba, Bolivia.

In 2019, she represented Ecuador at the Pan American Games held in Lima, Peru. She lost her bronze medal match against Thalía Mallqui of Peru in the women's 50 kg event.

At the 2020 Pan American Wrestling Championships held in Ottawa, Canada, she won one of the bronze medals in the 50 kg event. In the same year, she also competed in the Pan American Olympic Qualification Tournament, also held in Ottawa, Canada. She did not qualify for the 2020 Summer Olympics in Tokyo, Japan as she was eliminated in her first match.

In March 2021, she won the gold medal in the 55 kg event at the Matteo Pellicone Ranking Series 2021 held in Rome, Italy. In May 2021, she won the silver medal in the women's 50 kg event at the Pan American Wrestling Championships held in Guatemala City, Guatemala.

She won one of the bronze medals in her event at the 2022 Pan American Wrestling Championships held in Acapulco, Mexico. She won the gold medal in her event at the 2022 Bolivarian Games held in Valledupar, Colombia. She also won the gold medal in her event at the 2022 South American Games held in Asunción, Paraguay. She defeated Mariana Rojas of Venezuela in her gold medal match both at the 2022 Bolivarian Games and the 2022 South American Games.

Achievements

References

External links 
 

Living people
1994 births
Place of birth missing (living people)
Ecuadorian female sport wrestlers
Pan American Games competitors for Ecuador
Wrestlers at the 2019 Pan American Games
Competitors at the 2018 South American Games
Competitors at the 2022 South American Games
South American Games medalists in wrestling
South American Games gold medalists for Ecuador
South American Games bronze medalists for Ecuador
Pan American Wrestling Championships medalists
21st-century Ecuadorian women